Donald H. Bell (born March 10, 1942) is a Canadian politician. He is currently serving as a councillor for the City of North Vancouver (November 2011 to present). He previously represented the riding of North Vancouver as Member of Parliament in the House of Commons of Canada from 2004 to 2008 as a member of the Liberal Party of Canada. Before being elected, he was the mayor of the District of North Vancouver.

Born in New Westminster, British Columbia, Bell was first elected as an alderman in the District of North Vancouver in 1970, and again, topping the polls, in 1972 and 1974. He was elected mayor of the District in 1976, 1978, and 1980. He then voluntarily returned to the private sector for 13 years. In 1986 he revived his political career and was elected for three terms as a school trustee in 1986, 1988 and 1990, serving twice as school board chairman. He then returned to District council, being elected as a municipal councillor in 1993.  In 1996 he returned full-time to the mayor's chair by acclamation, and was re-elected as mayor in 1999 and 2002.

During the 2004 federal election, and against most pundits' predictions, he federally won the North Vancouver riding for the Liberals in what had been a strong Conservative seat for 30 years.  Bell defeated incumbent MP Ted White who had held the seat for the Reform, Alliance and Conservative parties since 1993.  Bell was re-elected to office in the 2006 federal election.

Bell served as BC federal Liberal Caucus Chair, and as Chair of the federal Liberal Northern and Western Caucus, covering the four western provinces and the northern territories. He was a member and vice-chair of the federal Standing Committee on Transport, Infrastructure and Communities, and the Liberal opposition critic for the Asia Pacific Gateway.

Bell was defeated in the 2008 election by Conservative Andrew Saxton.

Bell served as Chair of a special City of North Vancouver Civic Engagement Task Force from June 2010 to April 2011.

Bell was elected as City of North Vancouver Councillor, topping the polls in November 2011, for a 3-year term.

In 2014, Bell was re-elected as a City Councillor, for the first time not topping the polls.

In 2018, Bell was re-elected as a City Councillor, returning to the top of the polls.

Private sector

Bell was Public Affairs Director for Canada Safeway, based in Vancouver, from 1982 through 1995, when he then returned full-time to local politics as Mayor of the District in 1996.

Following his defeat in the federal election of 2008, he was Product Development Manager for Golden Griffin International Enterprises Inc. from the Fall of 2008 through 2009.

Electoral record

External links
 How'd They Vote?: Don Bell's voting history and quotes
 

1942 births
Liberal Party of Canada MPs
Living people
Mayors of places in British Columbia
Members of the House of Commons of Canada from British Columbia
People from New Westminster
21st-century Canadian politicians